Frank Bruno Kalin ["Fats"] (October 3, 1917 – January 12, 1975) was a  Major League Baseball outfielder. In 7 career games, he had no hits in 7 at-bats. He batted and threw right-handed.

From 1943 to 1945 Kalin served in the military during World War.

Kalin was born in Steubenville, Ohio and died in Weirton, West Virginia.

References

External links

1917 births
1975 deaths
Chicago White Sox players
Pittsburgh Pirates players
Major League Baseball outfielders
Baseball players from Ohio
McKeesport Tubers players
Mount Airy Graniteers players
Gadsden Pilots players
St. Paul Saints (AA) players
Hollywood Stars players
Indianapolis Indians players
San Francisco Seals (baseball) players